Sone Yay (lit: Downstream) is a 1990 Burmese drama film starring Kyaw Hein, Khin Than Nu, Zin Mar Oo and Min Oo. The film was directed by Kyi Soe Tun.

Plot
Aung Wai is working in the Construction Department in Yangon. His wife dies and Aung Wai is left with their son and daughter. Aung Wai wife's sister takes care of the children. When the children are old to attend the school, he is moved to Pyay.

Cast
Kyaw Hein as Aung Wai
Zin Mar Oo as Chit Thel Wai (his daughter)
Min Oo as Khin Maung Wai (his son)
Khin Than Nu as Khin Htway Yi

References

1990 films
Burmese drama films
1990 drama films